Indian Gap is an unincorporated community located between two hills in western Hamilton County in Central Texas.

History
Comanche Indians would use these hills to begin their raids, inspiring the name of the community. The community was settled in 1877. Hawley Gerrells was an early settler who opened a post office in his home in 1879. At various times his home served as a store, a church, and a social center. H.A. Shipman bought the townsite and farmed it for several years. In 1889, he took over Gerrells' store and post office, and in 1892 he sold town lots. The population was 90 in the 1920s. At one point, Indian Gap had a bank, a hotel, three stores, a blacksmith shop, a gin, a barber shop, churches, and a weekly newspaper, The Arrow. The post office closed in 1972. By the 1970s the population had dropped to 36 and remained there through 2000. The population was recorded as 27 in 2010 and went up to 35 in 2019.

Geography

Education
Indian Gap had its own schools at its peak, which closed about 1959. Today, the community is served by the Hamilton Independent School District.

Notable person
Indian Gap is the hometown of Frank N. Mitchell, awarded a Medal of Honor for his actions in the Korean War.

In popular culture
In 2009, author Dee Kelly wrote a book, A Good Man's Sin, centered around a boy who moves from a large city to play six-man football in Indian Gap, before making it into the National Football League.

References

Unincorporated communities in Hamilton County, Texas
Unincorporated communities in Texas